Highway 294 (AR 294, Ark. 294 and Hwy. 294) is an east–west highway in central Arkansas. Its western terminus is at an intersection with AR 161 in the city of Jacksonville. Its eastern terminus is at an intersection with AR 15 and AR 89 in the unincorporated community of Furlow.

Route description
The route begins at a T-intersection with AR 161 (South First Street) in Jacksonville and travels northeast along Military Road. It turns due east and leaves the city while crossing from Pulaski County into Lonoke County. East of the county line, AR 294 bends to the southeast and passes through the unincorporated community of South Bend. It continues in this direction for about  before bending slightly southeast toward Furlow. Finally, AR 294 enters Furlow, where it meets its eastern terminus at an intersection with AR 15 and AR 89. From this intersection, AR 15 heads south while AR 89 heads north and east.

Major intersections

References

294
Transportation in Pulaski County, Arkansas
Transportation in Lonoke County, Arkansas